Brent East was a parliamentary constituency in north west London; it was replaced by Brent Central for the 2010 general election. It returned one Member of Parliament (MP) to the House of Commons of the Parliament of the United Kingdom, elected by the first past the post system.

Boundaries 
1974–1983: The London Borough of Brent wards of Brentwater, Brondesbury Park, Carlton, Church End, Cricklewood, Gladstone, Kilburn, Mapesbury, Queen's Park, and Willesden Green.

1983–2010: The London Borough of Brent wards of Brentwater, Brondesbury Park, Carlton, Chamberlayne, Church End, Cricklewood, Gladstone, Kilburn, Mapesbury, Queen's Park, and Willesden Green.  The boundaries were redrawn in 1997, but the description of the constituency remained unchanged.

The constituency was one of three covering the London Borough of Brent in north-west London. It covered the south-east of the borough, including the areas of Brondesbury, Dollis Hill, Kilburn and Neasden, as well as parts of Willesden and Cricklewood.

History 
The constituency was created in 1974 and was first contested at the February general election of that year. An ethnically diverse area, it was previously one of the Labour Party's safest seats in London. It was held by Reg Freeson from 1974 to 1987, then by Ken Livingstone (following the abolition of the Greater London Council, of which he was leader, in 1986).

After Livingstone was expelled from the Labour Party for standing as an independent candidate for Mayor of London in 2000, he represented the constituency as an independent until standing down as an MP in 2001 to concentrate on his position as Mayor. Labour regained the seat at the 2001 general election, with Paul Daisley holding the seat until his death two years later.

The resulting Brent East by-election was held on 18 September 2003, with the 2003 Invasion of Iraq as a background. Labour lost the seat to Sarah Teather of the Liberal Democrats, with a considerable 29% swing, having come from a distant third place in 2001. Teather retained the seat at the 2005 general election, with a majority of 2,712 votes and a swing of 30.7% from Labour to the Liberal Democrats compared to the previous general election.

Members of Parliament

Election results

Elections in the 1970s

Elections in the 1980s

Elections in the 1990s

Elections in the 2000s

See also 
 List of parliamentary constituencies in London

Notes and references

Politics of the London Borough of Brent
Constituencies of the Parliament of the United Kingdom established in 1974
Constituencies of the Parliament of the United Kingdom disestablished in 2010
Parliamentary constituencies in London (historic)